Transair is a regional airline based in Senegal.

Destinations 

As of December 2019, Transair operates flights to the following destinations:

Fleet 
According to the Transair website, the airline operates the following aircraft:

References

External links
 

Airlines of Senegal
Airlines established in 2010
Civil aviation in Senegal
Organisations based in Dakar